Mathia Nisf is a village in West Champaran district in the Indian state of Bihar.

Demographics
As of 2011 India census, Mathia Nisf had a population of 912 in 177 households. Males constitute 54.16% of the population and females 45.83%. Mathia Nisf has an average literacy rate of 50.9%, lower than the national average of 74%: male literacy is 58.7%, and female literacy is 41.2%. In Mathia Nisf, 17.32% of the population is under 6 years of age.

References

Villages in West Champaran district